Torrenova (Sicilian: Turrinova) is a comune (municipality) in the Province of Messina in the Italian region Sicily, located about  east of Palermo and about  west of Messina.

Torrenova borders the following municipalities: Capo d'Orlando, Capri Leone, Militello Rosmarino, San Marco d'Alunzio, Sant'Agata di Militello.

Demographic evolution

References

Images of Torrenova 

 Piazza @ Torrenova in June 2008

 Main Street of Torrenova in June 2008

 Sunset over Torrenova in June 2008

 Beach @ Torrenova June 2008

Cities and towns in Sicily